E70 may refer to:

European route E70
BMW X5 (E70)
Toyota Corolla (E70)
E70, one of the Common ethanol fuel mixtures
Nokia E70 mobile phone
 King's Indian Defense, Encyclopaedia of Chess Openings code
 Izu-Jūkan Expressway, route E70 in Japan